KCLK-FM (94.1 FM, "Hot Country 94.1") is a radio station broadcasting a country music format, licensed to Clarkston, Washington, United States. As of January 2009, the station is owned by Pacific Empire Radio Corporation.

History
On June 1, 2017, KCLK-FM changed their format from oldies (branded as "Cool 94.1") to country, branded as "Hot Country 94.1".

References

External links
Hot Country 94.1 facebook

CLK-FM
Country radio stations in the United States
Radio stations established in 1971